"Quo Vadis, Captain Chandler?" was the 82nd episode of the M*A*S*H television series, and the tenth of season four. The episode aired on November 7, 1975. "Quo Vadis" is Latin for "Where are you going?" and is a reference to a conversation recounted in the apocryphal Acts of Peter in which Peter, fleeing his ministry and the threat of crucifixion in Rome, meets Jesus on the road, who has risen. Peter asks Jesus "Quo Vadis?," to which Jesus responds that he is going to Rome to be crucified again. This gives Peter the courage to return to his ministry in Rome, where he ultimately ends up crucified upside down.

The scriptwriter, Burt Prelutsky, credited the episode with revitalizing his career. The episode was nominated for a Humanitas Prize, but lost to another M*A*S*H episode.

Plot
Among the latest batch of wounded brought to the 4077th is a pilot, Captain Arnold Chandler (Alan Fudge), who believes himself to be Jesus Christ.  Majors Burns and Houlihan believe he is faking battle fatigue to earn a medical discharge, and set to prove this with the help of Army intelligence officer Colonel Flagg (Edward Winter).  With Colonel Potter's approval, Hawkeye and B.J. call on Dr. Sidney Freedman (Allan Arbus) to evaluate Chandler.

Freedman concludes that Chandler's delusion is an internal response to his guilt over killing people who had never harmed or even met him. Freedman believes that while prolonged psychiatric therapy may restore Chandler's sense of self, he will never again be an effective member of the military.

Near the end of the episode, company clerk Radar O'Reilly asks Chandler to bless his teddy bear. Chandler blesses the bear and also blesses Radar, who reveals for the first time in the series that his first name is actually Walter.

References

External links

M*A*S*H (season 4) episodes
1975 American television episodes